The 2012 Save Cup was a professional tennis tournament played on clay courts. It was the tenth edition of the tournament which is part of the 2012 ITF Women's Circuit. It took place in Mestre, Italy between 3 and 10 September 2012.

WTA entrants

Seeds

 1 Rankings are as of August 27, 2012.

Other entrants
The following players received wildcards into the singles main draw:
  Giulia Bruschi
  Julia Mayr
  Yuliana Lizarazo
  Anna Remondina

The following players received entry from the qualifying draw:
  Timea Bacsinszky
  Marina Melnikova
  Teodora Mirčić
  Anne Schäfer

The following players received entry by a lucky loser spot:
  Maša Zec-Peškirič

Champions

Singles

  Karin Knapp def.  Estrella Cabeza Candela, 6–1, 3–6, 6–1

Doubles

  Mailen Auroux /  María Irigoyen def.  Réka-Luca Jani /  Teodora Mirčić, 5–7, 6–4, [10–8]

External links
ITF Search 
Official site

Save Cup
Save Cup
2012 in Italian tennis